The Gare de Montérolier-Buchy (Montérolier-Buchy station) is a railway station in the commune of Montérolier in the Seine-Maritime department, France and near Buchy. The station is a stop on the Amiens–Rouen railway, and is the terminus a line to Motteville. It was also the terminus of the branch line to Saint-Saëns, which has been closed and removed.

The station
Montérolier-Buchy is now an unmanned station. It has two platforms on either side of two passenger tracks, between which there is a metal footbridge (not handicap-accessible). Numerous sidings lie to the south of the station.

The station is served by TER Normandie and TER Hauts-de-France trains from Rouen to Amiens and Lille. In summer it is also served by TER Haute-Normandie trains linking Rouen to Le Tréport-Mers.

Connections

Montérolier-Buchy is the terminus for two branch lines:
 To Saint-Saëns: a 10.2 km shuttle local line closed in 1953 and since dismantled.
 To Motteville (freight only)

History
The station was heavily bombed during the Second World War, because it controlled a junction and the Amiens–Rouen line was of great importance to the German Army.

A plaque placed on the station forecourt commemorates the existence there from April to June 1945 of a reception station for deportees, prisoners and returning French obligatory workers being repatriated from Nazi Germany.

References

See also
List of SNCF stations in Normandy

Railway stations in Seine-Maritime